Mirganj Assembly constituency was an assembly constituency in Gopalganj district in the Indian state of Bihar.

Overview
It was part of Gopalganj Lok Sabha constituency.

As a consequence of the orders of the Delimitation Commission of India, Mirganj Assembly constituency ceased to exist in 2010.

Election results

1977-2005
In the October 2005 and February 2005 state assembly elections, Ramsewak Singh of JD(U) won the Mirganj assembly seat defeating his nearest rival Babuddin Khan of Congress. Contests in most years were multi cornered but only winners and runners are being mentioned. Prabhu Dayal Singh of SAP defeated Abdul Samad, Independent, in 2000. Viswanath Singh of CPI(M) defeated Prabhudayal Singh of Congress in 1995. Prabhudayal Singh, Independent/ Congress defeated Viswanath Singh of CPI(M) in 1990 and Raj Mangal Mishra of JP in 1985. Raj Mangal Mishra of Janata Party (JP) defeated Anant Prasad Singh of Congress in 1980. Bhavesh Chandra Prasad of JP defeated Anant Prasad Singh of Congress in 1977.

References

Former assembly constituencies of Bihar
Politics of Gopalganj district, India